The Canadian Amateur Hockey Association (CAHA) was the national governing body of amateur ice hockey in Canada from 1914 until 1994, when it merged with Hockey Canada. Its jurisdiction included senior ice hockey leagues and the Allan Cup, junior ice hockey leagues and the Memorial Cup, amateur minor ice hockey leagues in Canada, and choosing the representative of the Canada men's national ice hockey team.

History

The Canadian Amateur Hockey Association (CAHA) was formed on December 4, 1914, at the Château Laurier hotel in Ottawa. The desire to set up a national body for hockey came from the Allan Cup trustees who were unable to keep up with organizing its annual challenges. The Allan Cup then became recognized as the annual championship for amateur senior ice hockey in Canada. In 1919, the CAHA became trustees of the Memorial Cup, awarded as the annual championship for junior ice hockey in Canada.

The CAHA negotiated an agreement with the National Hockey League (NHL) in 1940, which recognized junior hockey in Canada as a source of talent for the NHL and provided financial compensation to the CAHA for developing amateur players who were signed to professional contracts. The agreement included allowing the NHL to sign a limited number of junior age players and began a regulated relationship between amateur and professional hockey.

The CAHA filled the role of selecting the Canada men's national ice hockey team to represent the country in ice hockey at the Olympic Games and at the Ice Hockey World Championships. From 1920 until 1963, the CAHA usually chose the reigning Allan Cup champion to represent the country. For the 1964 Winter Olympics, the CAHA approved a proposal by Father David Bauer which established a permanent national men's team composed of student athletes reinforced with senior hockey players.

Hockey Canada was formed in 1969 to operate the national team and oversee Canada's involvement in international competition. The CAHA and Hockey Canada had a troubled relationship since a clear definition of responsibilities was never established, and the CAHA's authority over amateur hockey in Canada and its membership within the International Ice Hockey Federation were questioned. In 1994, CAHA president Murray Costello and Hockey Canada president Bill Hay, negotiated a merger between the two organizations. Originally called the Canadian Hockey Association, it has operated as Hockey Canada since 1998. Combining the two organizations allowed for the profits from the Canada Cup and the Summit Series to be invested into minor ice hockey in Canada, and also allowed professionals into international competition at the World Championships and eventually the Olympics.

Member branches
List of CAHA member branches from 1914 to 1994:

Executive personnel

Presidents
List of CAHA presidents from 1914 to 1994:

 1914–1915, W. F. Taylor
 1915–1919, James T. Sutherland
 1916–1918, J. F. Paxton (acting president)
 1919–1920, Frederick E. Betts
 1920–1921, H. J. Sterling
 1921–1922, W. R. Granger
 1922–1924, Toby Sexsmith
 1924–1926, Silver Quilty
 1926–1928, Frank Sandercock
 1928–1930, W. A. Fry
 1930–1932, Jack Hamilton
 1932–1934, Frank Greenleaf
 1934–1936, E. A. Gilroy
 1936–1938, Cecil Duncan
 1938–1940, W. G. Hardy
 1940–1942, George Dudley
 1942–1945, Frank Sargent
 1945–1947, Hanson Dowell
 1947–1950, Al Pickard
 1950–1952, Doug Grimston
 1952–1955, W. B. George
 1955–1957, Jimmy Dunn
 1957–1959, Robert Lebel
 1959–1960, Gordon Juckes
 1960–1962, Jack Roxburgh
 1962–1964, Art Potter
 1964–1966, Lionel Fleury
 1966–1968, Fred Page
 1968, Lloyd Pollock
 1969–1971, Earl Dawson
 1971–1973, Joe Kryczka
 1973–1975, Jack Devine
 1975–1977, Don Johnson
 1977–1979, Gord Renwick
 1979–1994, Murray Costello

Vice-presidents
List of notable CAHA vice-presidents who did not serve as president:

 Francis Nelson (1914–1915)
 Norman Dawe (1945–1948)
 Frank McKinnon (1975–1979)

Administrators
List of CAHA administrators from 1914 to 1979:

 Claude C. Robinson – secretary-treasurer (1914–1915)
 W. A. Hewitt – secretary-treasurer (1915–1919), registrar (1921–1925), registrar-treasurer (1925–1961)
 W. C. Bettschen – secretary-treasurer (1919–1920)
 H. E. James – secretary-treasurer (1920–1921)
 W. J. Morrison – secretary-treasurer (1921–1922)
 R. C. Chambers – Amateur Athletic Union of Canada governor (1922–1928)
 Fred Marples – secretary-treasurer (1922–1924), secretary (1926–1945)
 Dave Gill – secretary-treasurer (1924–1925)
 Jack Dunn – secretary (1925–1926)
 George Dudley – secretary (1945–1947), secretary-manager (1947–1960)
 Gordon Juckes – secretary-manager (1960–1961), registrar-treasurer and secretary-manager (1961–1968), executive director (1968–1977)
 David Branch – executive director (1977–1979)

Award recipients

Order of Merit
The CAHA agreed to establish an Order of Merit at the 1960 general meeting, to recognize an individual who "made outstanding contributions to Canadian amateur hockey". The first groups of recipients were named in January and May 1962.

List of notable recipients of the Order of Merit:

 1962, Hanson Dowell
 1963, Frank Sargent, Frank Dilio
 1964, George Panter
 1965, Frank Buckland
 1966, Art Potter, W. B. George
 1967, Jack Hamilton
 1969, W. G. Hardy
 1971, Jack Roxburgh
 1973, Matt Leyden
 1975, Bill Hanley
 1976, Gordon Juckes
 1979, Tubby Schmalz
 1984, Paul Dumont
 1986, Ed Chynoweth
 1990, Leo Margolis
 1990, Joseph R. Byrne, Bob Nadin
 1991, Frank McKinnon
 1994, Fran Rider

Gordon Juckes Award
The CAHA established the Gordon Juckes Award in 1981, to recognize an individual for outstanding contribution to the development of amateur hockey at the national level in Canada.

List of recipients of the Gordon Juckes Award:

 1981, Frank McKinnon
 1982, Joseph R. Byrne
 1983, Bob Hindmarch
 1984, Tom Pashby
 1985, Dave King
 1986, Georges Larivière
 1987, Dave Siciliano
 1988, Dale Henwood
 1989, Dennis McDonald
 1990, Vern Frizzell
 1991, Clare Drake
 1992, Gaston Marcotte
 1993, Colin Patterson
 1994, Howie Wenger

References

Bibliography
 
 

 
Sports organizations established in 1914
1914 establishments in Ontario
Sports organizations disestablished in 1994
1994 disestablishments in Ontario